Synbranchus is a genus of swamp eels native to Central and South America.

Species
There are currently three recognized species in this genus:
 Synbranchus lampreia Favorito, Zanata & Assumpção, 2005
 Synbranchus madeirae D. E. Rosen & Rumney, 1972
 Synbranchus marmoratus Bloch, 1795 (Marbled swamp eel)

References

External links

Synbranchidae